The 1997 ADAC Deutsche Super Touren Wagen-Cup was the fourth edition of the Super Tourenwagen Cup (STW).

Season summary
The 1997 season saw a battle for the championship between Laurent Aïello for Peugeot and Joachim Winkelhock for BMW. Aiello took an early lead which he held throughout the season, scoring an impressive 11 wins and 17 podiums in 20 races. Winkelhock meanwhile emerged as the prime challenger after an even start between him and teammate Johnny Cecotto, but despite a mid-season four-race winning streak he could not catch Aiello, who claimed the title for Peugeot. Reigning champions Audi meanwhile struggled, despite a star lineup including Emanuele Pirro, Yvan Muller and Tamara Vidali, with Pirro winning only a single race and the other two drivers failing to reach the podium. This championship is won by the only non-German manufacturer Peugeot.

Teams and drivers

Race calendar and results

Championship results

Manufacturers' Trophy

Footnotes

External links 

Super Tourenwagen Cup
Super Tourenwagen Cup Season